Mark Gerard Hilton (born 15 January 1960, in Middleton, Greater Manchester) is an English former professional footballer who played in the Football League as a midfielder.

After retiring from professional football, Hilton was player-manager of Mossley from December 1989 until October 1990.

References

1968 births
Living people
English footballers
Association football midfielders
Oldham Athletic A.F.C. players
Bury F.C. players
Witton Albion F.C. players
Ashton United F.C. players
Mossley A.F.C. players
Oldham Borough F.C. players
Mossley A.F.C. managers
English Football League players
English football managers